Dreamin' in a Casket is the sixth full-length album by Swedish hard rock band Hardcore Superstar.  It is the band's last release with guitarist Thomas Silver, and their last on Gain Records before switching to Nuclear Blast.

Track listing

Personnel

 Jocke Berg - vocals
 Thomas Silver - guitar
 Martin Sandvik - bass, backing vocals
 Magnus "Adde" Andreasson - drums, percussion, backing vocals

References

2007 albums
Hardcore Superstar albums